Solehin Kanasian Abdullah (born 20 January 1983) also known as K.Soley is a Malaysian footballer who plays as a right midfielder for PBMS F.C. Previously, he had played for Kelantan FA for a season and also be the parts of the team be the champion of Malaysia Super League on season 2011 for the first time.

Career
On 30 June 2007, he helped Kedah FA to win the Malaysian FA Cup after beating Perlis FA 4–2 on penalties( both teams tied at 0–0 after extra time ) in Batu Kawan Stadium. In November 2010, he joined Kelantan FA for 2011 season but he can't get himself to be in the first team squad. Kelantan FA, later released him and in December 2011, he signed a contract with Selangor FA for 2012 Malaysia Super League season.

International career
Soley made his international debut in a friendly against Indonesia on 6 June 2008, after substituting for Muhammad Shukor Adan, in which the game finished 1–1. This is currently his only appearance for the national team

References

External links
 

1983 births
Living people
Malaysian footballers
Malaysia international footballers
Kedah Darul Aman F.C. players
People from Kedah
Perlis FA players
Kelantan FA players
Association football midfielders